Marcel Merminod (16 April 1893 – 31 May 1979) was a Swiss film actor. He appeared in 21 films between 1930 and 1970. He starred in the 1970 film Black Out, which was entered into the 20th Berlin International Film Festival.

Selected filmography
 Fire in the Opera House (1930)
 The Son of the White Mountain (1930)
 The Threepenny Opera (1931)
 Princess, At Your Orders! (1931)
 The Triangle of Fire (1932)
 Black Out (1970)

References

External links

1893 births
1979 deaths
Swiss male film actors